The Mongol conquest of Khorasan took place in 1220-21, during the Mongol conquest of the Khwarazmian Empire. As the Khwarazmian Empire disintegrated after the capture of the large cities of Samarkand and Bukhara by the Mongol Empire, Shah Muhammad II fled westwards in the hope of gathering an army. Genghis Khan ordered two of his foremost generals, Subutai and Jebe, to follow the Shah and prevent any such Khwarazmian resurgence; meanwhile, he sent his youngest son Tolui south to subjugate any resistance.

The region Khorasan contained Silk Road cities such as Merv, Nishapur, and Herat, which were among the largest and richest in the world. Tolui systematically besieged and captured them in turn, pillaging their wealth and executing their inhabitants. Although modern historians regard the figures of medieval chroniclers to be exaggerated (one account has 2.4 million people killed in Nishapur alone), they still estimate the death toll to be in the millions, especially if the resulting famine and starvation is taken into account. The campaign was certainly one of the bloodiest in human history.

Meanwhile, Subutai and Jebe had pursued the Shah to an island on the Caspian Sea, where he died; the two generals, with the Khan's permission, then set out on an expedition around the Caspian Sea, which would take three years. However, the Shah's son, Jalal al-Din, managed to slip through Tolui's forces, and assemble a large army near Ghazni. He inflicted one of the first large Mongol defeats on Shigi Qutuqu at the Battle of Parwan in autumn 1221, but was subsequently defeated by Genghis Khan himself.

Campaign
Genghis Khan invaded Khraream with a skilled, disciplined, combat proven army of 150,000 to 200,000 soldiers, made mostly of Mongols and other allied tribes who were well drilled in their method of warfare. The also contained a corps of Chinese siege engineers for attacking besieged cities with siege engines. Genghis Khan had requested  Shah Ala ad-Din Muhammad II to punish the governor of Otrar Ghatir Khan Inal for murdering a Mongol trade caravan in 1218, the Shah instead had murdered the Mongol envoys, triggering the war. Genghis Khan was a charismatic, intelligent and experienced leader, his sons Jochi, Chagatai, Ogedei and Tolui were also competent generals, and he was also served by brilliant generals like Jebe and Subutai, who were adept in employing flexible and innovative tactics. 

The Shah may have been able to mobilize a mercenary army numbering 200,000 to 400,000 men, but his Turkish soldiers were undisciplined, unity was lacking between the Turks, Iranians, Arabs and Afghans in the army, and the mistrust the Shah had for his Qanqli Turk troops and commanders meant he could only offer battle under favorable conditions with superior numbers. He adopted a defense in depth strategy based on fortified cities, Muhammad II stationed garrisons at various cities including Otrar, Bukhara, Benekat and Samarkand with his veteran soldiers, trusting the Mongol inexperience with siege craft and their unfamiliarity with the terrain delay their progress to give the chance to offer battle a his own initiative. He planned to raise a new army beyond the Amy Daria near Kelif, and then strike the Mongols in Transoxania, or defend the Amu Darya barrier by preventing any Mongol crossing of the river, and if needed retreat to Ghazni and then to India.

Genghis Khan invested Otrar with his entire field army in September 1219. He then sent a corps under Jochi up the Syr Daria, another detachment was sent to attack Banakat. Leaving Chagatai and Ogedei to maintain the siege of Otrar, Genghis Khan and Tolui crossed the Kizil Kum desert to attack Bukhara, which fell on February 1220, and Samarkand, which was taken on March 1220 after defeating the relief armies sent by the Shah. Banakat was also occupied, Otrar fell in April 1220 and  the Mongols armies from Banakat and Otrar joined Genghis Khan near Nasaf, spending the Summer of 1220 resting his army and horses. Jochi had taken all the towns along Syr Daria, including Sighnaq and Jend by April 1220, then camped on the Kipchak steppes. Genghis Khan sent a 30,000  - 40,000 men strong Mongol army led by Jebe and Subutai and his own son in law Toghachar to hunt down the Shah.

The rapid fall of Transoxania ruined the Shah’s strategy, and the news of Jebe and Subutai near Amu Daria in force unnerved the Shah, and he began to retreat west along with Jalal al-Din. The Shah had halted for a while at Nishapur, when he received news of the Mongols had crossed the Amu Daria, the Shah moved across Persia, then eluded the Mongols by pretending to make for Baghdad then doubling back into Persia, and eventually found refuge in a Caspian sea island, where he died in December 1220, naming Jalal ad-Din his heir. The Mongol army pursuing the Shah had sacked several cities across Persia, including  Tus, Qazvin and Ardabil, and then had wintered in the Mughan steppes.

Genghis Khan stormed Tirmidh in the Autumn of 1220, then marched east to the upper reaches of the Vakash River in Tajikistan, subdued the Badakhshan region, and wintered at  Sil-Saray. Jochi advanced from the north while Chagatai and Odgedei marched up the Amu Darya towards Gurganj. Mongol detachments were raiding south of the Amu Daria, the forts of Nusrat Koh and Walkh fortress (probably Zuhak), were besieged, and Mongols had set up patrols to prevent refugees from escaping across the Qara Qum desert, and move towards Ghazni.

The Sultan had reached Gurganj from the island after his father’s death. The city officials preferred his brother Uzlak Shah as Sultan, and after discovering a plot against his life, The Sultan with 300 cavalry crossed the Karakum desert, defeated a Mongol detachment near Nasa to reach Nishapur, where he intended to raise an army. He left Nishapur with his following when Mongols approached the city. The Mongols gave chase after the Sultan across Kuhistan, who managed to outrun his pursuers to reach Bost. Here an army of 10,000 Turks commanded by his maternal uncle Amin Malik joined him, and the Sultan reached Ghazni after driving off a Mongol army from Qanhahar after a three day battle.

Ghazni had experienced political unrest during 1220. Amin Malik had attempted to rally resistance in Sistan and Ghazni, but Governor of Peshawar Malik Ikhtiyar ud-Din Mohammad Khar-Post, a Ghurid had occupied Ghazni, bluntly refused to cooperate Amin Malik against the Mongols, stating Ghurs and Turks could not live together. Ikhtiyar ud-Din Mohammad Khar-Post was assassinated by Khwarazm loyalists, who were in turn murdered by Afghan officials. When Jalal al-Din arrived, the city had just fallen to loyal Khwarizm forces, In addition to the 30,000 Qanqli Turk troops of Amin Malik, Jalal ad-Din was joined by Ghurids, Afghans, Qurlaq,  Khalaj and Turkmens, and now had a commanded a well equipped, if not firmly united army of 60,000 – 70,000 men.

While Jalal al-Din was making his way from Gurganj to Ghazni during the Spring of 1221 and then spending the Summer of 1221 rallying his forces, the Mongols had commenced the Siege of Gurganj, which had fallen after a four or seven month siege, after which the armies of Tolui, Chagatai and Ogedei  joined Genghis Khan, who had taken another four months to capture Nursat Koh.} Tolui had by that time completed the conquest of Khurasan, sacking Merv on February 25, 1221, destroying Nishapur on April 10, 1221, and forcing Heart to surrender on terms before joining Genghis Khan.

Sultan Jalal al-Din marched north in the Autumn of 1221, In Spring Jalal ad Din moved north to Parwan, then attacked the Mongol army besieging the castle at Wailan Kotal north of Charikar. In response Genghis Khan sent a 30,000 strong army under Shigi-Qutuqu to confront the Sultan, which may have grown to 45,000, after other Mongol detachments joined up. Sultan Jalal al-Din destroyed this army at the Battle of Parwan. A dispute over division of Spoils after the battle saw the desertion of the Afghan contingent after the battle. Amin Malik, leader of the Turks and the Sultan’s father in law, struck Saif al-Din Ighrak, leader of the Afghans, with a whip. Sultan Jalal ad-Din refused to discipline Amin Malik, and Ighraq reproached the Sultan,  and he along with the Khalaj, Afghan and some of the Qanqli troops, deserted after nightfall and camped in. Shigi-Qutuqu survived and fled to join Genghis Khan, and rebellion broke out in Khurasan and eventually in Heart after the news of Mongol defeat spread.

References

Notes

References

Conflicts in 1221
1221 in the Mongol Empire
Sieges involving the Mongol Empire
Military history of Afghanistan
Bamyan Province
13th century in Afghanistan
Sieges of the Middle Ages
Sieges involving Afghanistan
Mongol invasion of the Khwarazmian Empire